The 1979 Star World Championships were held in Marstrand, Sweden in 1979.

Results

References
 
 

Star World Championships
Star World Championships
Star World Championships
Sailing competitions in Sweden